Hironori Takeuchi (born December 22, 1964 in Kanagawa) is a Japanese auto racing driver.

Career
Takeuchi competed in the Japanese Touring Car Championship between 1996 and 1998. He competed in the All-Japan GT Championship between 1995 and 2004, winning it in 2001. He continued to compete in the series after it became Super GT in 2005, competing in the GT300 class until 2007.

In 2005 Takeuchi joined Ao Chi Hong at his Ao's Racing Team for the finale of the World Touring Car Championship, the Race of Macau, in a Toyota Altezza. He failed to qualify for the races after setting a fastest lap over the required time, almost twelve seconds off the pace.

Racing record

JGTC/Super GT results
(key) (Races in bold indicate pole position) (Races in italics indicate fastest lap)

Complete JTCC results 
(key) (Races in bold indicate pole position) (Races in italics indicate fastest lap)

References

External links
Career statistics at Driver Database

Living people
1964 births
Japanese racing drivers
Japanese Touring Car Championship drivers
Super GT drivers
World Touring Car Championship drivers
Asian Le Mans Series drivers